Sonja Petrović may refer to:
 Sonja Vasić, née Petrović, Serbian basketball player
 Sonja Petrović (statistician), Serbian-American statistician and professor